Cras is a district of Besançon located to the east of the city.  Its name comes from the Franche-Comté "Cra" which means "crow".

History

Education 
In the district of Cras there are two public schools, the Paul Bert kindergarten, and the Lancy public primary school.

Transport 
The lines 5 and 35 serve the area.

References

Areas of Besançon

fr:Cras (Besançon)